The following lists events that happened during 1967 in Laos.

Incumbents
Monarch: Savang Vatthana 
Prime Minister: Souvanna Phouma

Events

January
1 January - 1967 Laotian parliamentary election
9 January - Ban Naden raid

July
29 July-1 August - 1967 Opium War

References

 
1960s in Laos
Years of the 20th century in Laos
Laos
Laos